Ellis Lorenzo Webster is an Anguillan politician and physician. He is the premier of the British Overseas Territory of Anguilla, first elected when he led the Anguilla Progressive Movement to victory in the general election held on 29 June 2020.

Biography

Webster was born on Island Harbour. Initially he studied dental therapy. In 1986, Webster graduated from University of the Virgin Islands in biology. In 1991, he graduated from Yale University School of Medicine, and specialised in Otorhinolaryngology at the University of Iowa.

Webster first practised in Florida. Around 2000, he returned to Anguilla. In 2020, he was elected premier of Anguilla.

References

External links

 Ellis Webster at caribbeanelections.com

Members of the House of Assembly of Anguilla
Premiers of Anguilla
Living people
Government ministers of Anguilla
Year of birth missing (living people)
University of the Virgin Islands alumni
Yale School of Medicine alumni